Constitution of 1949 may refer to:

Argentine Constitution of 1949
Hungarian Constitution of 1949
Federal Constitution of 1949, United States of Indonesia 
Basic Law for the Federal Republic of Germany